

Elam, c. 2700 – 519 BCE
The Elamites settlement was in southwestern Iran, where is modern Khuzestan, Ilam, Fars, Bushehr, Lorestan, Bakhtiari and Kohgiluyeh provinces. Their language was neither Semitic nor Indo-European, and they were the geographic ancestors of the Achaemenid/Persian empire. For a full list of Elamite major and minor kings see:
List of rulers of Elam

Western Kingdoms, c. 2550 – c. 700 BCE

Marhasi kingdom,Legrain, 1922; Cameron, 1936; D’yakonov, 1956; The Cambridge History of Iran; Hinz, 1972; The Cambridge Ancient History; Majidzadeh, 1991; Majidzadeh, 1997. –
Some scholars suggested that Marhasi were located in southeastern Iran.
 Migirenlil ( BCE)
 Unnamed King ( BCE)
 Abalgamash ( – 2312 BCE), revolted against Rimush of Akkad
 Hubshumkibi ( BCE contemporary with Naram-Sin king of Akkad)
 Unnamed King ( BCE)
 Hashibatal ( BCE contemporary with Shulgi king of Ur)
 Arvilukpi ( BCE contemporary with Amar-Sin king of Ur)
 Pariashum ( BCE contemporary with Amar-Sin king of Ur)
 Libanugshabash (2044– BCE)
 Mashhundahli ( BCE contemporary with Ibbi-Sin king of Ur)

Namar kingdom, c. 24th century–c. 750 BCE
 Tishari ( BCE)
 Inbir ( BCE)
 Sadarmat ( BCE)
 Arisen ( BCE)
 Unknown Queen ( BCE)
 Karziyabku ( BCE)
 Ritti-Marduk ( BCE)
 Marduk-Mudammiq (until 844/2 BCE)
 Ianzu (844/2–835/4 BCE)

Zakhara kingdom, c. 2350–c. 2250 BCE
 The unnamed prince of Zakhara ( BCE)
 Ungapi ( BCE). Regent of Zakhara
 The unnamed king of Zakhara (after 2254 BCE)

Ganhar kingdom, c. 21st century BCE
 Kisari (– BCE)
 Warad-Nannar ( BCE)

Parsua kingdom, – BCE

Ellipi kingdom, – BCE

Northwestern Kingdoms, c. 2400 – 521 BCE

Lullubi kingdom, c. 2400–c. 650 BCE
 Immashkush ( BCE)
 Anubanini ( BCE) he ordered to make an inscription on the rock near Sar-e Pol-e Zahab
 Satuni ( BCE contemporary with Naram-Sin king of Akkad and Khita king of Awan)
 Irib ( BCE)
 Darianam ( BCE)
 Ikki (precise dates unknown)
 Tar ... duni (precise dates unknown) son of Ikki. his inscription is found near the inscription of Anubanini
 Nur-Adad ( – 880 BCE)
 Zabini ( BCE)
 Hubaia ( BCE) vassal of Assyrians
 Dada ( BCE)
 Larkutla ( BCE)

Gilzan kingdom, c. 900–c. 820 BCE
 Unknown king (– BCE)
 Asau
 Upu ( BCE)

Ida kingdom, c. 860–c. 710 BCE
 Nikdiara (– BCE)
 Sharsina (– BCE)
 Parnua ( BCE)

Allabria, c. 850–c. 710 BCE
 Ianziburiash
 Artasari
 Bēl-apla-iddina (until 716 BCE)
 Itti ( BCE)

Gizilbunda kingdom, c. 850–c. 700 BCE
 Pirishati (until 820 BCE) (in Urash)
 Titamashka ( BCE) (in Sasiashu)
 Kiara ( BCE) (in Kar-Sibutu)
 Engur ( BCE) (in Sibaru)
 Zizi ( BCE) (in Appatar)
 Zala ( BCE) (in Kit-Patia)

Araziash kingdom, c. 850 – 716 BCE
 Barua (precise dates unknown)
 Munsuarta ( BCE)
 Unknown king (– BCE)
 Ramatea ( BCE)
 Satareshu ( BCE)

Manna kingdom, c. 850–c. 611 BCE

Andia Kingdom, c. 850–c. 700 BCE
 Unnamed king of Andia ( BCE) contemporary with Daian-Ashur military leader of Assyrian empire in western Iran
 Telusina ( – 715 BCE) who revolted against king of Manna and was defeated by Sargon II king of Assyria

Kishesu kingdom, c. 830–c. 710 BCE

Sagbitu kingdom, c. 820–c. 710 BCE

Abdadana kingdom, c. 810–c. 710 BCE

Zikartu kingdom, c. 750 – 521 BCE
 The unnamed king of Zikartu
 Mettati ( – 714 BCE)
 Bagparna (from 714 BCE)
 Tritantaechmes (until July 15, 521 BCE)

Median dynasty, 726–521 BCE
The Medes were an Iranian people. The Persians, a closely related and subject people, revolted against the Median empire during the 6th century BCE.

Karalla kingdom, c. 720–c. 700 BCE

Uriaku kingdom, c. 720–c. 700 BCE

Karzinu kingdom, c. 720–c. 700 BCE

Saparda kingdom, c. 720–c. 670 BCE

 Dusanni (r. c. 670 BCE)

Scythian kingdom, c. 700–c. 530 BCE
 Išpakaia (unknown - )
 Partatua ( - ), possible son of Išpakaia
 Madea ( – 625 BCE), son of Partatua

Southern Kingdoms, c. 710–550 BCE

Achaemenid Kings of Parsumash, c. 710–c. 635 BCE
 Achaemenes, founder of the dynasty.
 Teispes (I) son of Achaemenes – BCE
 Cambyses (I) son of Teispes (I) – BCE
 Cyrus (I) son of Cambyses (I) – BCE

Achaemenid Kings of Anshan, c. 635 – 550 BCE
 Teispes of Anshan, or Teispes (II) son of Achaemenes or Cyrus (I), king of Persia, king of Anshan, – BCE
 Cyrus I of Anshan or Cyrus (II), son of Teispes (II), king of Anshan – BCE
 Cambyses I of Anshan or Cambyses (II), his son, king of Anshan  – 559 BCE
 Cyrus II the Great or Cyrus (III), his son, king of Anshan 559–529. He conquered the Median Empire in 550 and established the Persian Empire.

 Line of Ariaramnes
 Ariaramnes of Persia, son of Teispes (II), king of Persia. His reign is doubtful.
 Arsames of Persia, son of Ariaramnes, king of Persia until 550, died after 520. His reign is doubtful.
 His son Hystaspes was Satrap of Parthia under Cambyses II, Smerdis and his son Darius.

References

Bibliography
 Cameron, George, "History of Early Iran", Chicago, 1936 (repr., Chicago, 1969; tr. E.-J. Levin, L’histoire de l’Iran antique, Paris, 1937; tr. H. Anusheh, ایران در سپیده دم تاریخ, Tehran, 1993)
 D’yakonov, I. M., "Istoriya Midii ot drevenĭshikh vremen do kontsa IV beka de e.E" (The history of Media from ancient times to the end of the 4th century BCE), Moscow and Leningrad, 1956; tr. Karim Kešāvarz as Tāriḵ-e Mād, Tehran, 1966.
 Hinz, W., "The Lost World of Elam", London, 1972 (tr. F. Firuznia, دنیای گمشده ایلام, Tehran, 1992)
 Legrain, Leon, "Historical Fragments", Philadelphia, The University of Pennsylvania Museum Publications of the Babylonian Section, vol. XIII, 1922.
 Majidzadeh, Yusef, "History and civilization of Elam", Tehran, Iran University Press, 1991.
 Majidzadeh, Yusef, "History and civilization of Mesopotamia", Tehran, Iran University Press, 1997, vol.1.
 Potts, D. T., The Archaeology of Elam, Cambridge University Press, 1999.
 Qashqai, Hamidreza, Chronicle of early Iran history, Tehran, Avegan press, 2011 (in Persian: گاهنمای سپیده دم تاریخ در ایران )
 The Cambridge Ancient History
 The Cambridge History of Iran
 Vallat, Francois. Elam: The History of Elam. Encyclopaedia Iranica, vol. VIII pp. 301-313. London/New York, 1998.

Iran history-related lists
Persia

Elamite kings